National Theatre, Boston may refer to:

 National Theatre, Boston (1836)
 National Theatre, Boston (1911)